Piet van Est (11 August 1934 – 17 October 1991) was a Dutch racing cyclist. He rode the Tour de France in 1957–1962 and 1964 and finished within the first 30 places in 1958, 1960 and 1962. In 1961 he won one stage of the Giro d'Italia and finished 31st overall. He won the Ronde van Nederland in 1958 and two stages of the race in 1963. His brothers Nico and Wim van Est were also professional cyclists.

References

1934 births
1991 deaths
Dutch male cyclists
Dutch Giro d'Italia stage winners
Dutch Tour de France stage winners
People from Moerdijk
Cyclists from North Brabant
20th-century Dutch people